Abd al-Razzaq ibn Hammam ibn Nafi' al-San'ani (744-827 CE, 126–211 AH), was an eighth-century Yemeni hadith scholar purportedly of Persian descent who compiled a hadith collection known as the Musannaf of Abd al-Razzaq.

Biography 
Abd al-Razzaq was born in 126 AH/744 CE to a father who was a hadith scholar. He was a mawla of the Banu Himyar, hence his nisba al-Himyari. At the age of 20, he began his studies in Sanaa where he was a student of Ma'mar ibn Rashid for eight years, also learning under Ibn Jurayj, Sufyan ibn ʽUyaynah and Sufyan al-Thawri. In pursuit of hadith, Abd al-Razzaq journeyed to the Hejaz, Syria and Iraq; when attending the lectures of scholars to learn hadith through audition, he would reportedly bring several stationers with him to assist in recording them. In the latter half of the second Hijri century, he compiled his own musannaf, consisting mostly of traditions transmitted by his teachers. He would also teach hadith himself; among those who transmitted from him are Yaḥya ibn Maʻin, Ali ibn al-Madini and Ahmad ibn Hanbal. He died in mid-Shawwal 211 AH/early January 827 CE.

Works
 Musannaf of Abd al-Razzaq
 Tafsir book that was included in Mustadrak al-Hakem

References

Persian Sunni Muslim scholars of Islam
8th-century Iranian people
Yemenite people of Iranian descent
8th-century Muslim scholars of Islam
Taba‘ at-Tabi‘in hadith narrators